In functional analysis, two methods of constructing normed spaces from disks were systematically employed by Alexander Grothendieck to define nuclear operators and nuclear spaces. 
 
The other method is used if the disk  is absorbing: in this case, the auxiliary normed space is the quotient space  
If the disk is both bounded and absorbing then the two auxiliary normed spaces are canonically isomorphic (as topological vector spaces and as normed spaces).

Induced by a bounded disk – Banach disks

Throughout this article,  will be a real or complex vector space (not necessarily a TVS, yet) and  will be a disk in

Seminormed space induced by a disk

Let  will be a real or complex vector space. For any subset  of  the Minkowski functional of  defined by:
If  then define  to be the trivial map  and it will be assumed that 

Let  will be a real or complex vector space. For any subset  of  such that the Minkowski functional is a seminorm on  let  denote 

which is called the seminormed space induced by  where if  is a norm then it is called the normed space induced by 

This justifies the study of Banach disks and is part of the reason why they play an important role in the theory of nuclear operators and nuclear spaces.

The inclusion map  is called the canonical map.

Suppose that  is a disk. 
Then  so that  is absorbing in  the linear span of  
The set  of all positive scalar multiples of  forms a basis of neighborhoods at the origin for a locally convex topological vector space topology  on  
The Minkowski functional of the disk  in  guarantees that is well-defined and forms a seminorm on  
The locally convex topology induced by this seminorm is the topology  that was defined before.

Banach disk definition

A bounded disk  in a topological vector space  such that  is a Banach space is called a Banach disk, infracomplete, or a bounded completant in 

If its shown that  is a Banach space then  will be a Banach disk in  TVS that contains  as a bounded subset.

This is because the Minkowski functional is defined in purely algebraic terms. 
Consequently, the question of whether or not  forms a Banach space is dependent only on the disk  and the Minkowski functional  and not on any particular TVS topology that  may carry. 

Properties of disk induced seminormed spaces

Bounded disks

The following result explains why Banach disks are required to be bounded.

Hausdorffness

The space  is Hausdorff if and only if is a norm, which happens if and only if  does not contain any non-trivial vector subspace. 
In particular, if there exists a Hausdorff TVS topology on  such that  is bounded in  then is a norm. 
An example where  is not Hausdorff is obtained by letting  and letting  be the -axis.

Convergence of nets

Suppose that  is a disk in  such that  is Hausdorff and let  be a net in  
moreover, in this case it will be assumed without loss of generality that  for all 

Relationship between disk-induced spaces

The disk as the closed unit ball

The disk  is a closed subset of  if and only if  is the closed unit ball of the seminorm ; that is, 
 

Sufficient conditions for a Banach disk

The following theorem may be used to establish that  is a Banach space. 

Note that even if  is not a bounded and sequentially complete subset of any Hausdorff TVS, one might still be able to conclude that  is a Banach space by applying this theorem to some disk  satisfying 

because 

The following are consequences of the above theorem:

A sequentially complete bounded disk in a Hausdorff TVS is a Banach disk.
Any disk in a Hausdorff TVS that is complete and bounded (e.g. compact) is a Banach disk.
The closed unit ball in a Fréchet space is sequentially complete and thus a Banach disk.

Suppose that  is a bounded disk in a TVS 

Properties of Banach disks

Let  be a TVS and let  be a bounded disk in 

If  is a bounded Banach disk in a Hausdorff locally convex space  and if  is a barrel in  then  absorbs  (that is, there is a number  such that 

If  is a metrizable locally convex TVS then for every bounded subset  of  there exists a bounded disk  in  such that  and both  and  induce the same subspace topology on

Induced by a radial disk – quotient

Then  is a neighborhood basis at the origin for some locally convex topology  on  
The topology  is Hausdorff if and only if  is a norm, or equivalently, if and only if  or equivalently, for which it suffices that  be bounded in  
The topology  need not be Hausdorff but  is Hausdorff. 

If in addition  is bounded in  then the seminorm  is a norm so in particular,  
In this case, we take  to be the vector space  instead of  so that the notation  is unambiguous (whether  denotes the space induced by a radial disk or the space induced by a bounded disk).

Canonical maps

The canonical map is the quotient map  which is continuous when  has either the norm topology or the quotient topology.

 to the equivalence class  where one may verify that the definition does not depend on the representative of the equivalence class  that is chosen. 
This canonical map has norm  and it has a unique continuous linear canonical extension to  that is denoted by 

Let   and  be the canonical maps. 
Then  and

Induced by a bounded radial disk

Suppose that  is a bounded radial disk. 
Since  is a bounded disk, if  then we may create the auxiliary normed space  with norm ; since  is radial,  
Since  is a radial disk, if  then we may create the auxiliary seminormed space  with the seminorm ; because  is bounded, this seminorm is a norm and  so  
Thus, in this case the two auxiliary normed spaces produced by these two different methods result in the same normed space.

Duality

be the polar of  
Because  by the bipolar theorem, it follows that a continuous linear functional  belongs to  if and only if  belongs to the continuous dual space of  where  is the Minkowski functional of  defined by

Related concepts

A disk in a TVS is called infrabornivorous if it absorbs all Banach disks.

A linear map between two TVSs is called infrabounded if it maps Banach disks to bounded disks.

Fast convergence

Every fast convergent sequence is Mackey convergent.

See also

Notes

References

Bibliography

External links

 Nuclear space at ncatlab

Functional analysis